The 2022–23 Marquette Golden Eagles men's basketball team represented Marquette University during the 2022–23 NCAA Division I men's basketball season. The team is led by second-year head coach Shaka Smart and plays their home games at Fiserv Forum in Milwaukee, Wisconsin as a member of the Big East Conference.

Previous season
The Golden Eagles finished the 2021–22 season 19–13, 11–8 in Big East play to finish a tie for fifth place. As the No. 5 seed, they lost in the quarterfinals of the Big East tournament to Creighton. They received an at-large bid to the NCAA tournament as the No. 9 seed in the East Region, where they lost in the First Round to North Carolina.

Offseason

Departures

Incoming transfers

Recruiting classes

2022 recruiting class

2023 recruiting class

Roster

Schedule and results

|-
!colspan=12 style=| Non-conference regular season

|-
!colspan=12 style=| Big East regular season

|-
!colspan=12 style=| Big East tournament

|-
!colspan=9 style="|NCAA tournament

Source

References

Marquette Golden Eagles men's basketball seasons
Marquette Golden Eagles
Marquette Golden Eagles men's basketball
Marquette Golden Eagles men's basketball
Marquette